This article presents a list of the historical events and publications of Australian literature during 1988.

Events

 Peter Carey won the 1988 Booker Prize for Oscar and Lucinda

Major publications

Novels 
 Peter Carey, Oscar and Lucinda
 Gerald Murnane, Inland
 Tim Winton, In the Winter Dark

Children's and young adult fiction 
Hesba Fay Brinsmead, When You Come to the Ferry
 Gillian Rubinstein, Beyond the Labyrinth
 Tim Winton, Jesse

Poetry 
 Gwen Harwood, Bone Scan
 Judith Rodriguez, New and selected poems: The house by water
 John Tranter, Under Berlin

Drama 
 Andrew Bovell, After Dinner
 Jan Cornall, Escape from a Better Place

Awards and honours
 Dorothy Auchterlonie Green , for "service to Australian literature, particularly as a writer, critic and teacher"
 Elizabeth Jolley , for "service to Australian literature"
Rosemary Wighton , for "public service, to literature and to the community"
Tom Hungerford , for "service to literature"
David Martin (poet) , for "service to Australian literature"
Gavin Souter , for "service to literature and journalism"
 Len Beadell , for "service to the Public service and to literature"

Deaths 
A list, ordered by date of death (and, if the date is either unspecified or repeated, ordered alphabetically by surname) of deaths in 1988 of Australian literary figures, authors of written works or literature-related individuals follows, including year of birth.

 28 February — Kylie Tennant, novelist, playwright, short-story writer, critic, biographer and historian (born 1912)
 31 July — Stephen Murray-Smith, writer, editor and educator (born 1922)

Unknown date
 Vincent Buckley, poet, teacher, editor, essayist and critic (born 1925)

See also 

1988 in Australia
1988 in literature
 1988 in poetry
 List of years in literature
 List of years in Australian literature

References

1988 in Australia
Australian literature by year
20th-century Australian literature
1988 in literature